The Sinhalese monarch - anachronistically referred to as the Kings of Sri Lanka - featured the heads of state of the Sinhala Kingdoms, in what is today Sri Lanka. 

The Sinhalese monarchy originates in the settlement of North Indian Indo-Aryan speaking immigrants to the island of Sri Lanka. The Landing of Vijay (as described in the traditional early chronicles of the island, the Dipavamsa and Mahavamsa) recounts the date of the establishment of the first Sinhala Kingdom in 543 BC when Indian prince Prince Vijaya (543–505 BC) and 700 of his followers arrived in Sri Lanka, establishing the Kingdom of Tambapanni. In Sinhalese mythology, Prince Vijaya and followers are told to be the progenitors of the Sinhalese people. However, according to the story in the Divyavadana, the immigrants were probably not led by a scion of a royal house in India, as told in the romantic legend, but rather may have been groups of adventurous and pioneering merchants exploring new lands. Historian G.C. Mendis on the other hand has suggested that the Vijaya myth has no historical basis.

The Sinhala Kingdoms comprised the political states of the Sinhalese people and their ancestors; it existed not as a series of successive kingdoms known by the city which had the administrative centre. These are (in chronological order): the kingdoms of Tambapanni, Upatissa Nuwara, Anuradhapura, Polonnaruwa, Dambadeniya, Gampola, Kotte, Sitawaka and Kandy. The kingdoms existed in what is today the modern state of Sri Lanka. The last Sinhala Kingdom ceased to exist by 1815 with Sri Vikrama Rajasinha of Kandy after generations of European influences and upheaval in the royal court. During the Kingdom's two millennia, other political entities also existed on the island, including the Jaffna Kingdom, Vanni chieftaincies and the Portuguese and Dutch colonies. However, these political entities were not part of the Sinhala Kingdoms. A separate page lists the monarchs of the Jaffna Kingdom.

During the reign of Devanampiya Tissa (307–267 BC) Buddhism emerged through Ashoka of India. By the time of Kithsirimevan (304–332), Sudatta, the sub king of Kalinga and Hemamala brought the Tooth Relic of the Buddha to Sri Lanka because of unrest in the country. Kithsirimevan carried it in procession and placed the relic in a mansion named Datadhatughara. He ordered this procession to be held annually, and this is still done as a tradition in the country. The Tooth Relic of the Buddha soon became one of the most sacred objects in the country and a symbol of kingship. The person who was in possession of the Tooth Relic thereafter would be the rightful ruler of the country.

The role of the monarch was absolute. He was head of state but would be aided with high level officials and a board of ministers. The monarch was seen as the supreme ruler throughout the island, even at times when he did not have absolute control over it. They sought to establish control over the whole island, though in reality this was more of an aspiration. However periods of effective control over the whole island did exist from time to time. The monarch also held judicial power and influence. Judicial customs, traditions and moral principles based on Buddhism were used as the bases of law. The laws and legal measures were proclaimed by the king, and were to be followed by the justice administration. However the king was the final judge in legal disputes, and all cases against members of the royal family and high dignitaries of the state were judged by him. Though, the king did have to exercise this power with care and after consulting with his advisers.

This article is a list of monarchs that have reigned over the nine successive kingdoms under the Sinhalese monarchy. It is based on the traditional list of monarchs as recorded in the chronicles of the island, in particular the Mahavamsa and Rajavaliya. It is not a list of ethnically Sinhalese monarchs as it contains all Sinhalese and foreign rulers who have reigned, chronologically and in succession, in the Sinhala Kingdoms. Each monarch belongs to one of nine royal houses (Vijaya, Lambakanna I, Moriya, Lambakanna II, Vijayabahu, Kalinga, Siri Sanga Bo, Dinajara and Nayaks), and follows a tradition of regnal names that span the entirety of the monarchy. For example, Vijayabahu was used 7 times over multiple kingdoms and multiple royal houses over a period of 500 years and there is no overlap of names, Vijayabahu I, II, III, IV, V, VI, VII. The same is true for Aggabodhi, Bhuvanaikabahu, Kassapa, Mahinda, Parakramabahu and others. The Sinhalese Monarchy has also been ruled over by foreigners from India, which has occurred several times throughout the course of the kingdom's history. This is usually occurred through the usurpation of the throne.

Notes 
This list should be used with the following factors kept in mind. Firstly, the dates provided for the earliest monarchs are difficult to objectively verify; those particularly difficult to know have been denoted with a (?) mark. The date August 20, 1200 is the earliest known fixed date in Sri Lankan history, which was for the coronation of Sahassa Malla.

Another thing to be noted is that several monarchs had usurped the throne of Lanka including Sinhalese monarchs such as Anikanga, Chodaganga, Sri Vallabha of Polonnaruwa and Mahinda VI. The usurpers may have received support from rival kingdoms such as the Cholas.

Note on chronology 
It should be borne in mind that there is controversy about the base date of the Buddhist Era, with dates between the 6th century BC and 4th century BC being advanced as the date of the parinibbana of the Buddha. As Wilhelm Geiger pointed out, the Dipawamsa and Mahawansa are the primary sources for ancient South Asian chronology; they date the consecration (abhisheka) of Ashoka (268 BC according to modern scholarship) to 218 years after the parinibbana. Chandragupta Maurya ascended the throne 56 years prior to this, or 162 years after the parinibbana. The approximate date of Chandragupta's ascension is within two years of 321 BC (from Megasthenes). Hence the approximate date according to the Mahavamsa of the parinibbana is between 485 and 481 BC.

According to Geiger, the difference between the two reckonings seems to have occurred at sometime between the reigns of Udaya III (946–954 or 1007–1015) and Pârakkama Pandya (c. 1046–1048), when there was considerable unrest in the country. However, mention is made of an embassy sent to China by Cha-cha Mo-ho-nan in 428. The name may correspond to 'Raja (King) Mahanama', who (by the traditional chronology) reigned about this time.

Furthermore, the traveller-monk Xuanzang, who attempted to visit Sri Lanka about 642, was told by Sri Lankan monks (possibly at Kanchipuram) that there was trouble in the kingdom, so he desisted; this accords with the period of struggle for the throne between Aggabodhi III Sirisanghabo, Jettha Tissa III and Dathopa Tissa I Hatthadpath in 632–643.

Recent indological research has indicated that the Parinibbana of the Buddha may be even later than previously supposed. A majority of the scholars at a symposium held in 1988 in Göttingen regarding the problem were inclined towards a date of 440–360 BCE. However, the Theravada Buddhist canon was first put into writing in Sri Lanka, and the chronology of the following list is based on the traditional Therevada/Sri Lankan system, which is based on a parinibbana date of 543 BC, sixty years earlier than the Mahayana calendar. Dates after c. 1048 are synchronous.

The Mahavamsa was written nearly a millennium after the purported date of Vijaya's arrival, and the traditional chronology and relationships of the earliest kings have been called into question by some scholars. Referring to the period following Devanampiya Tissa's rule, archaeologist W. D. J. Benilie Priyanka Emmanuel states:

Kingdom of Tambapanni (543–437 BC)

House of Vijaya (543–437 BC)

Anuradhapura Kingdom (437 BC – 1017 AD)

House of Vijaya (437–237 BC)

Sena and Guttika (237–215 BC)

House of Vijaya (215–205 BC)

Elara (205–161 BC)

House of Vijaya (161–103 BC)

The Five Dravidans (103–89 BC)

House of Vijaya (89 BC – 67 AD)

House of Lambakanna I (67–429)

The Six Dravidians (429–455)

House of Moriya (455–691)

House of Lambakanna II (691–1017)

Chola-occupied Anuradhapura (1017–1055)

Kingdom of Polonnaruwa (1055–1236)

House of Vijayabahu (1055–1187)

House of Kalinga (1187–1197)

House of Vijayabahu, restored (1197–1200)

House of Kalinga, restored (1200–1209)

House of Vijayabahu, restored (1209–1210)

Lokissara (1210–1211)

House of Vijayabahu, restored (1211–1212)

Pandyan dynasty (1212–1215)

Eastern Ganga dynasty (1215–1236) 

After Kalinga Magha invaded, with the intent of ruling the whole island, the Kingdom of Polonnaruwa was sacked. This caused massive Sinhalese migration to the south and west of the island. Unable to capture the whole island Kalinga Magha establishes the Jaffna kingdom becoming its first monarch. The Jaffna kingdom is situated in modern northern Sri Lanka while the Kingdom of Dambadeniya was established by Vijayabahu III on the rest of the island in around 1220.

Kingdom of Dambadeniya (1220–1345)

House of Siri Sanga Bo (1220–1345)

Kingdom of Gampola (1345–1412)

House of Siri Sanga Bo (1345–1412)

Kingdom of Kotte (1412–1597)

House of Siri Sanga Bo (1412–1597)

Kingdom of Sitawaka (1521–1594)

House of Siri Sanga Bo (1521–1594)

Kingdom of Kandy (1469–1815)

House of Siri Sanga Bo (1473–1592)

House of Dinaraja (1591–1739)

Nayaks of Kandy (1739–1815)

Timeline

Notes

References

Further reading

Primary sources

Secondary sources

External links 
 Lakdiva, List of sovereigns of Lanka
 Vijaya and the Lankan Monarchs
 Complete list of Sri Lankan Leaders
 The Mahavamsa History of Sri Lanka

Sri Lanka
Monarchs
Monarchs